Charles William Crosse (13 June 1854 – 28 May 1905) was an English sportsman who played international rugby union for England and first-class cricket.

Crosse was capped twice for England, first against Scotland in 1874 and the other against Ireland a year later, both times as a forward.

In 1875, Crosse played a first-class cricket match for Oxford University. A right handed top order batsman, he made just five and eight in the only two innings of his first-class career. He also represented Scotland at cricket, playing a match against Yorkshire in 1878. Previously, he had played cricket while at Rugby School before going up to Trinity College, Oxford.

References

1854 births
1905 deaths
People educated at Rugby School
Alumni of Trinity College, Oxford
English rugby union players
England international rugby union players
English cricketers
Oxford University cricketers
Oxford University RFC players
Rugby union players from Hertfordshire
Rugby union forwards